Ken Rinciari (1935–2010) was an illustrator at The New York Times, The New York Review of Books and other print publications. He was also a photographer and author of children's books and limited edition volumes of other books and stories.

1935 births
2010 deaths
American illustrators
Date of birth missing
Date of death missing
Place of birth missing
Place of death missing